Fire Department Giebelstadt is the fire service for the city Giebelstadt's 12 boroughs. The department has its headquarters in Giebelstadt city park.

The FDG, is the largest municipal volunteer fire department in Upper Franconia. FDG has approximately 32 uniformed officers and firefighters and 12 EMTs and paramedics.

History
It was on formed on 5 November 1874.

Fire commanders 1874–present

1875–1877 Georg Holzmann
1878–1892 Michael Müller
1893–1901 Kilian Dehner
1902–1909 Johann Scheckenbach
1910–1918 Georg Döller
1919–1938 Johann Hellrich
1939–1951 Gregor Müller
1952–1961 Friedrich Henn
1962–1966 Hugo Honecker
1967–1971 Alfons Müller
1972–1986 Günther Pöhlmann
1987–1992 Helmut Sußner
1993–1995 Stefan Tries
1996–        Michael Kramosch

References

External links 
 

Fire departments of Germany
Würzburg (district)
1874 establishments in Germany
Organizations established in 1874
Organisations based in Bavaria